Prudence the Pirate is a lost 1916 American silent comedy-drama film directed by William Parke and starring Gladys Hulette. It was produced by Thanhouser Company's Gold Rooster Plays and released through Pathé Exchange.

Cast

Gladys Hulette as Prudence
Flora Finch as Aunty
William Parke Jr. as Tommy
Barnett Parker as John Astorbilt
A. J. Andrews 
The Ugliest Dog in the World as Panthus (this credit per AFI)

References

External links

lantern slide

1916 films
American silent feature films
Lost American films
Thanhouser Company films
Films directed by William Parke
American black-and-white films
1910s English-language films
1916 comedy-drama films
1916 lost films
Lost comedy-drama films
1910s American films
Silent American comedy-drama films